Andrew RT Davies became the Leader of the Opposition in Wales on the 24 January 2021 after the resignation of Paul Davies as leader the following day. After the 2021 Senedd election the Welsh Conservatives got a record 16 seats out of 60, and Andrew R. T. Davies remained in the post.

Background 

Paul Davies was seen drinking with other politicians on the Senedd estate on 8 and 9 December 2020 that could have proven contrary to Welsh Government COVID alcohol ban that was brought in four days before. He apologised for his actions on the 19 January 2021 and the Conservative Group in the Senedd gave there unanimous support in a meeting on the 22 January for Paul Davies to stay as leader. The BBC reported that Paul Davies was considering stepping down in that meeting, and a report by the Senedd Commission said that it could be a possible breach of COVID rules. There was much uproar by grassroots supporters and senior members of the Welsh Conservatives of his actions and on 23 January Paul Davies stepped down with immediate effect.

There was a short discussion between Conservative Members of the Senedd the following day where they gave their unanimous support for Andrew R. T. Davies to become leader. He created a cabinet out of members left in the frontbench (Darren Miller, Nick Ramsey and Paul Davies had stepped down) on the same day. David Melding re-joined the cabinet after stepping down in September 2020 following disagreements with the parties Internal Market stance.

The Welsh Conservatives won 16 seats in the 2021 Senedd Election a record for the party. Davies said after the election that he would remain in post until the next election in 2026. He later formed his shadow cabinet on the 27 May 2021 with members that left the frontbench after the 'booze gate', Darren Miller and Paul Davies, re-entering the frontbench.

Members

See also 

 Drakeford government
 Members of the 6th Senedd

References 

Cabinets established in 2021
2021 establishments in Wales
British shadow cabinets
Politics of Wales